Dießner may refer to:

 Bernd Dießner (born 1946), retired East German long-distance runner
 Jörg Dießner (born 1977), German rower
 Ullrich Dießner (born 1954), German rower
 Walter Dießner (born 1954), German rower

German-language surnames